Tangachromis dhanisi is a species of cichlid endemic to Lake Tanganyika where they live in deep waters having been caught at depths of . They prey on copepods.  This species reaches a length of  TL.  They can also be found in the aquarium trade.

References

Limnochromini
Taxa named by Max Poll
Taxonomy articles created by Polbot
Fish described in 1949